Montalbo is a small village (curazia) of San Marino. It belongs to the municipality of San Marino.

See also
San Marino (city)
Cà Berlone
Canepa (San Marino)
Casole
Castellaro
Murata
Santa Mustiola

Curazie in San Marino
Geography of the City of San Marino